Qarah Malek (also Romanized as Ghareh Malek, Qara Milk, and Qareh Malek) is a village in Japelaq-e Sharqi Rural District, Japelaq District, Azna County, Lorestan Province, Iran. At the 2013 census, its population was 19, in 2 families.

References 

Towns and villages in Azna County